Inventing the Future: Postcapitalism and a World Without Work is a 2015 monograph by Nick Srnicek and Alex Williams, published by Verso Books.

Synopsis
The book begins (chapters 1–2) by critiquing dominant left-wing thinking in the West, suggesting that since the cultural upheavals of the 1960s it has been characterised by a "folk politics" which aims to bring politics down to the "human scale". By emphasising temporal, spatial, and conceptual immediacy, folk politics tends to privilege reacting to change (through protest and resistance) over imagining new long-term goals; the immediate and tangible over the abstract; personal involvement in direct action over institutional responses; single issues over complex strategies; horizontal organising over hierarchical; and the local over the large-scale. While arguing that these approaches are important and can at times be effective, Srnicek and Williams argue that they are insufficient to tackle global capitalism and specifically neoliberalism.

In chapter 3, Srnicek and Williams contrast left-wing folk politics with the success of neoliberalism in achieving global cultural hegemony. This is illustrated by the long-term, top-down strategising characterised by the Walter Lippmann Colloquium and Mont Pelerin Society, the development of networks of think-tanks, and positioning of neoliberal ideas and thinkers in government and media. This strategy enabled neoliberals to offer a set of ready-made policies to leaders looking for new ideas in the wake of the collapse of the Bretton Woods system and the 1970s oil shocks. Srnicek and Williams suggest that the Left needs to adopt similar strategies. Accordingly, in chapter 4 they argue that the Left needs to offer a positive vision of a new modernity, embracing the importance of dismantling hierarchies of gender and race while also accepting that promoting universal human values is necessary to achieve a progressive vision of the future and positive freedom.

Chapter 5, 'The Future isn't Working', identifies a crisis in capitalism's ability (and willingness) to employ all members of society, arguing that 'there is a growing population of people that are situated outside formal, waged work, making do with minimal welfare benefits, informal subsistence work, or by illegal means'. Chapter 6 looks towards a post-scarcity economy and argues that a 'Mont Pelerin of the Left’ should press for:

 Full automation of as much work as possible.
 The reduction of the working week, redistributing the remaining work more equitably.
 The provision of an unconditional and generous income for all citizens.
 The diminishment of the work ethic.

Srnicek and Williams argue that it is necessary to raise the costs of labour in order to incentivise investment in labour-saving technologies, envisaging a positive feedback loop between a tighter supply of labour and technological advancement. Chapter 7 argues that to achieve these goals, the Left must invest in establishing a new hegemonic status for these ideas, building on the successes of capitalism, repurposing its structures, and investing in scholarly research and the modelling of emergent policies.

The final chapter argues that an 'anti-work' or 'post-work' politics—providing a clear vision of a future where people work less—should appeal to a broad enough range of different interest groups to be the basis for a populist movement. The chapter sketches how this populism needs to be harnessed to get post-work politics into mainstream media, intellectual life, trade unions, and political parties, and how the pressure points where direct action can be targeted have changed as capitalism has undermined the power of organised labour to disrupt production.

Responses

In November 2015, the book was the subject of a symposium, involving its authors and a number of other thinkers who presented critical responses to the book. The proceedings were published in blog format at the academic International Relations blog The Disorder of Things. In 2018, Jon Cruddas characterised the book as "a genuinely audacious, supremely confident intervention in terms of its intellectualism and its presentation of a highly specific future for the left. It has caught a wave and helped to re-populate the left’s post-crash void and jettison late New Labour managerialism." However, he also argued that Inventing the Future and Paul Mason's PostCapitalism dispensed with ideas of humanism that, he claimed, should be central to a left-wing project: "these books have been treated uncritically despite the reappearance of anti-humanist thinking within the left. Humanism needs to be defended; or, as Orwell wrote, "the job of the thinking person is not to reject socialism but to make up his mind to humanise it"".

Reviews

See also
 Criticism of capitalism
 Critique of work
 Post-capitalism
 Post-work society
 Universal basic income

References

2015 non-fiction books
Books critical of capitalism
Books about socialism
Literature critical of work and the work ethic
Universal basic income
Verso Books books
Books about automation